Bath is a constituency in the House of Commons of the Parliament of the United Kingdom represented by Wera Hobhouse of the Liberal Democrats.

Perhaps its best-known representatives have been the two with international profiles: William Pitt the Elder (Prime Minister 1766–1768) and Chris Patten, the last Governor of Hong Kong (1992-1997).

It has the joint shortest name of any constituency in the current Parliament, with 4 letters, the same as Hove.

Constituency profile
The seat is tightly drawn around the historic city including the University of Bath campus. Compared to UK averages residents are wealthier and house prices are higher.

History 
Bath is an ancient constituency which has been constantly represented in Parliament since boroughs were first summoned to send members in the 13th century.

Unreformed constituency before 1832
Bath was one of the cities summoned to send members in 1295 and represented ever since, although Parliaments in early years were sporadic. Like almost all English constituencies before the Great Reform Act of 1832, it originally returned two members to each Parliament.

The precise way in which Bath's MPs were chosen in the Middle Ages is unknown. It is recorded that "election was by the Mayor and three citizens being sent from thence to the county court who in the name of the whole community, and by the assent of the community, returned their representatives"; but whether the "assent of the community" was real or what form it took is unrecorded, even assuming it was not a completely dead letter. By the 17th century, elections had become more competitive, as the means of election in Bath had become a franchise restricted to the Mayor, Aldermen, and members of the Common Council (the City Corporation), a total of thirty voters. The freemen of the city challenged this state of affairs in 1661 and again in 1705, claiming the right to vote and petitioning against the election of the candidates chosen by the corporation, but on both occasions the House of Commons, which at the time was still the final arbiter of such disputes, decided against them. The Commons resolution of 27 January 1708, "That the right of election of citizens to serve in Parliament for this city is in the mayor, aldermen and common-council only", settled the matter until 1832.

Bath was the most populous of the English boroughs where the right to vote was restricted to the corporation. At the time of the 1801 census, it was one of the ten largest towns or cities in England by population, and was almost unique in that the voters generally exercised their powers independently. As was the case elsewhere, the Common Council was not popularly elected, all vacancies being filled by co-option by the existing members, so that once a united interest had gained majority control it was easy to retain it. Most corporation boroughs quickly became pocket boroughs in this way, the nomination of their members of parliament being entirely decided by a patron who may have given some large benefaction to the area or simply used bribery to ensure only his supporters or croneys became members of the corporation. But in Bath, the Common Council retained its independence in most periods and took pride in electing two suitable members of parliament who had either strong local connections or else a national reputation. Nor was there any suggestion of bribery or other corruption, prolific in other "independent" constituencies. Pitt the Elder wrote to the corporation in 1761, on the occasion of his re-election as one of Bath's members, to pay tribute to "a city ranked among the most ancient and most considerable in the kingdom, and justly famed for its integrity, independence, and zeal for the public good".

But even in Bath the limited electorate who voted for its members of parliament expected them to work to procure favours for their constituents and enterprises to a degree that would be considered corrupt today. By exercising efforts successfully in this direction, the representatives could in return expect a degree of influence over the voters that differed little from patronage in the pocket boroughs, except that its duration was limited. Thus the lawyer Robert Henley, a Bath MP from 1747 and also Recorder of Bath from 1751, seems to have been assumed to have control over both seats while he held one of them and immediately after; yet when he gained a peerage and thus a seat in the House of Lords, Pitt replaced him on the understanding of being independently chosen. Pitt himself then acquired similar influence: the Council vetoed Viscount Ligonier's suggestion that he should be succeeded by his nephew when he was elevated the Lords in 1763, but instead allowed Pitt to nominate a candidate to be his new colleague, and voted overwhelmingly for him when he was opposed by a local man. But Pitt's influence also waned when he fell out with the Council over the Treaty of Paris later in 1763.

In the final years before the Reform Act, however, local magnates exerted a more controlling influence in Bath. Oldfield, writing early in the 19th century, stated that at that time the Marquess of Bath nominated one member and John Palmer the other; both were former members of parliament for the city (Lord Bath having sat as Viscount Weymouth, before his father's death took him to the Lords), but neither was then in the Commons – each had a relation sitting as one of the members for Bath. Palmer had succeeded Earl Camden who held one of the two seats before 1802. At the time of the Reform Act, the Lord Bath was still being listed as influencing one of the seats, although the second was considered independent once more.

Reformed constituency (1832–1918)
The Great Reform Act opened up the franchise to all resident (male) householders whose houses had a value of at least £10 a year and imposed uniform voting provisions for all the boroughs. Bath was one of the boroughs which continued to elect two members. Given the city's medium size and its generally high property values, its electorate increased by a factor of almost 100, from 30 in 1831 to 2,853 in 1832, and created a competitive and generally marginal constituency which swung between Whig and Tory (later Liberal and Conservative) control. The parliamentary borough's boundaries were also slightly extended, but only to take in those areas into which the built-up area of the city had expanded. Bath's most notable member during this period was probably the Conservative social reformer Lord Ashley, better remembered under his eventual title of 7th Earl of Shaftesbury, for the Factory Acts, the first of which came into effect while he was one of the MPs for Bath.

The franchise was further reformed in 1867 and 1885 with only minor boundary changes. Bath was lucky to retain its two-member representation in the 1885 reforms, as its electorate of under 7,000 was near the lower limit, and this situation lasted until the 1918 reforms. The continued Liberal strength was unusual for a prosperous and predominantly middle-class town, and the seats could until 1918 not be considered safe for the Conservatives.

Modern single-member constituency (since 1918)
Bath's representation was reduced to a single member in 1918. The Conservatives held the seat continuously until 1992, except in the 1923 Parliament, and until World War II generally won comfortably – the Liberals retained such strength that the non-Conservative vote was split, and Labour could not rise above third place until the landslide of 1945, when the Conservative James Pitman achieved a very marginal majority. From 1945 to 1970, Labour presented the main challenge, and came within 800 votes of taking the seat in 1966.

The Liberal revival in the 1970s saw the two more left-wing parties swap places, helped by the adoption of a nationally known candidate, Christopher Mayhew, who had defected from the Labour Party. The formation of the SDP–Liberal Alliance made Bath a realistic target. The SDP came 1500 votes from winning in 1987 under Malcolm Dean. In 1992, Conservative Chris Patten was ousted by Liberal Democrat Don Foster in a narrow defeat widely blamed on Patten's strategising, campaign leading and communicating as Conservative Party chairman rather than canvassing his own constituents. At each election from 1992 to 2015, a different Conservative candidate contested the constituency.

The boundary changes implemented in 1997 took Bathampton, Batheaston, Bathford, Charlcombe and Freshford from the Wansdyke district, containing about 7,000 voters; these were moved elsewhere in 2010. Nominally, these areas had a slightly higher tendency to prefer a Conservative candidate but, the national government suffering from sleaze, in 1997 Don Foster more than doubled his almost 4,000 vote majority to over 9,000 votes. After winning two intervening elections, in 2010 Foster achieved his highest majority of 11,883 votes.

In the 2015 general election, following the national Liberal Democrat collapse and Foster standing down, the seat was regained by the Conservatives under Ben Howlett with a 3,833-vote majority.

Bath is estimated to have voted to remain in the European Union by 68.3% in the 2016 referendum on the UK's membership of the EU.

In the 2017 general election, the constituency was regained by the Liberal Democrats' Wera Hobhouse, with the second-highest Liberal Democrat vote share increase nationally (after Richmond Park).

Boundaries 

Bath is one of only two UK Parliament constituencies to be surrounded by another constituency. Bath is entirely surrounded by the North East Somerset constituency. The other constituency, York Central, is entirely surrounded by York Outer.

Current boundaries 
Following the review of the constituencies in the former county of Avon carried out by the Boundary Commission for England, as of the 2010 general election the constituency covers only the city of Bath, and none of the surrounding rural area. Between 1997 and 2010, it also included some outlying villages such as Southstoke and Freshford now in the North East Somerset constituency. The changes in 2010 also resulted in Bath becoming a borough constituency, instead of a county constituency as it was before.

In 2019, taking effect at that year's local elections, boundary changes to the wards took place, which included the abolition of Abbey ward, the merger of Lyncombe and Widcombe wards, the creation of Moorlands ward, and the replacement of Oldfield with Oldfield Park. These ward changes did not change the parliamentary constituency boundary.

The constituency's electoral wards are:
Bathwick, Combe Down, Kingsmead, Lambridge, Lansdown, Moorlands, Newbridge, Odd Down, Oldfield Park, Southdown, Twerton, Walcot, Westmoreland, Weston and Widcombe & Lyncombe.

Historic boundaries 
Before 1832: The parishes of St James (Bath), St Peter and St Paul (Bath), and St Michael (Bath), and part of the parish of Walcot
1832–1867: As above, plus the parishes of Bathwick and Lyncombe & Widcombe, and a further part of the parish of Walcot
1867–1918: As above, plus part of the parish of Twerton
1918–1983: The county borough of Bath (boundary changes in 1955)
1983–1997: The City of Bath (no boundary changes)
1997–2010: The City of Bath, and the District of Wansdyke wards of Bathampton, Batheaston, Bathford, Charlcombe, and Freshford

Members of Parliament 
The current Member of Parliament is Wera Hobhouse of the Liberal Democrats.

From 30 July to 4 August 1766, Bath was the constituency of the Prime Minister: William Pitt the Elder represented the constituency until he was raised to the peerage as Earl of Chatham shortly after becoming Prime Minister.

Members of Parliament 1295–1640 
Constituency created (1295)

Members of Parliament 1640–1918

Members of Parliament since 1918

Elections

Elections in the 2020s

Elections in the 2010s

Elections in the 2000s

Elections in the 1990s

Elections in the 1980s

Elections in the 1970s

Elections in the 1960s

Elections in the 1950s

Elections in the 1940s

Election in the 1930s 
General Election 1939–40:

Another General Election was required to take place before the end of 1940. The political parties had been making preparations for an election to take place and by the Autumn of 1939, the following candidates had been selected;
Conservative: Lord Ronaldshay
Liberal: Philip William Hopkins
Labour: George Gilbert Desmond
A minority of Bath Conservatives, led by the town Mayor, Adrian Hopkins objected to Ronaldshay who had no link with the town. Hopkins was considering running as an Independent. Desmond was under pressure to withdraw in favour of the Liberal candidate fighting on a Popular Front programme

Election in the 1920s

Election in the 1910s 

General Election 1914–15:

Another General Election was required to take place before the end of 1915. The political parties had been making preparations for an election to take place and by July 1914, the following candidates had been selected;
Unionist: Charles Hunter, Lord Alexander Thynne
Liberal: Harry Geen, J.C. Meggott

Elections in the 1900s

Elections in the 1890s

Elections in the 1880s 

 Caused by Hayter's appointment as a Lord Commissioner of the Treasury.

Elections in the 1870s

 

 

 

 Caused by Dalrymple's death.

 

 Caused by Cadogan's elevation to the peerage, becoming Earl Cadogan.

 

 Caused by Tite's death.

Elections in the 1860s

Elections in the 1850s

 

 

 

 

 Caused by Phinn's resignation after his appointment as Assistant Secretary to the Admiralty

 
 
 

 
 

 Caused by Ashley-Cooper's succession to the peerage, becoming 7th Earl of Shaftesbury

Elections in the 1840s

Elections in the 1830s

Notes

References

Sources 

 The BBC/ITN Guide to the New Parliamentary Constituencies (Chichester: Parliamentary Research Services, 1983)

D Brunton & DH Pennington, Members of the Long Parliament (London: George Allen & Unwin, 1954)

The Constitutional Year Book for 1913 (London: National Union of Conservative and Unionist Associations, 1913)
FWS Craig, British Parliamentary Election Results 1832–1885 (2nd edition, Aldershot: Parliamentary Research Services, 1989)
 FWS Craig, British Parliamentary Election Results 1918–1949 (Glasgow: Political Reference Publications, 1969)
 Lewis Namier & John Brooke, The History of Parliament: The House of Commons 1754–1790 (London: HMSO, 1964)
 THB Oldfield, The Representative History of Great Britain and Ireland (London: Baldwin, Cradock & Joy, 1816)
 Henry Pelling, Social Geography of British Elections 1885–1910 (London: Macmillan, 1967)
 J Holladay Philbin, Parliamentary Representation 1832 – England and Wales (New Haven: Yale University Press, 1965)
 Edward Porritt and Annie G Porritt, The Unreformed House of Commons (Cambridge University Press, 1903)
 Colin Rallings & Michael Thrasher (eds), Media Guide to the New Parliamentary Constituencies (London: BBC/ITN/PA News/Sky, 1995)
 Robert Walcott, English Politics in the Early Eighteenth Century (Oxford: Oxford University Press, 1956)
 Robert Waller, The Almanac of British Politics (1st edition, London: Croom Helm, 1983)
 Frederic A Youngs, Jr, Guide to the Local Administrative Units of England, Vol I (London: Royal Historical Society, 1979)

External links 
Election 2005 - Bath BBC News, 23 May 2005

Parliamentary constituencies in Somerset
Constituencies of the Parliament of the United Kingdom established in 1295
Constituencies of the Parliament of the United Kingdom represented by a sitting Prime Minister
Politics of Bath, Somerset
Geography of Bath, Somerset